The Ineos 1:59 Challenge was a successful 2019 attempt by Kenyan athlete Eliud Kipchoge to break the two-hour mark for running the marathon distance. The event was specifically created for Kipchoge and held in Vienna, Austria, on 12 October 2019.

Due to rotating pacemakers, delivery of hydration by bicycle, and the lack of open competition, the achievement was not eligible to be ratified as a marathon world record, and is not recognized as such by World Athletics.

Summary

In 2016, Nike organized the Breaking2 project to train a team of runners for an attempt at completing a marathon distance in under two hours, a benchmark previously considered impossible to achieve. Eliud Kipchoge of Kenya, the world record holder in the men's marathon and the current defending Olympic marathon champion was one of the runners on that team. When the event was finally held on 6 May 2017 at Autodromo Nazionale Monza in Milan, Kipchoge finished first before the other runners, Zersenay Tadese and Lelisa Desisa, but fell short of the two-hour goal by 25 seconds.

On 6 May 2019, the 65th anniversary of the four-minute mile, multinational chemicals company Ineos announced that Kipchoge would attempt again to achieve a sub-two-hour marathon run, in an event sponsored by the company. This marked a shift away from the original format of Breaking2. Instead of three participants, only Kipchoge targeted the record, having already set the marathon world record of 2:01:39 at the Berlin Marathon on 16 September 2018. 

For the Ineos challenge, Kipchoge was joined by forty-one pacemakers, who rotated twice each lap and ran in a V-formation, rather than the diamond formation chosen for the previous attempt. Kipchoge was placed at the bottom of the formation with two pacemakers running behind him. Each lap of the course featured two  out-and-back stretches of Hauptallee with the turning points coming at the Lusthaus and Praterstern roundabouts at either end of the avenue, in the Prater park. The entire route inclines only . Spectators were present for the attempt. 

The organizers planned to run the event on Saturday, 12 October 2019, but they had a reserve window of eight days in case of poor weather conditions. The attempt was run on 12 October starting at 08:15 CET. Organizers allowed a start time between 05:00 and 09:00, but chose 08:15 to maximize viewership.

Results

The achievement was recognised by Guinness World Records with the titles "Fastest marathon distance (male)" and "First marathon distance under two hours".

Directly after finishing the run, Kipchoge stated: "I am feeling good. After Roger Bannister in 1954 it took another 63 years, I tried and I did not get it - 65 years, I am the first man - I want to inspire many people, that no human is limited."

Accessories and optimization strategies

The organizers of the attempt added many techniques during the run which cumulatively assisted Kipchoge and the pacemakers:
 Pacing lasers guided the pacemakers and the main runner, thus allowing them to run at a precise pace and meaning energy was not lost in unwanted acceleration.
 The route was carefully chosen to ensure that no effort would be wasted on battling the wind or on directional or incline changes. This was achieved by the fact that most of the course was lined with tall trees reducing wind, and the course was very flat.
 The location of the race was chosen because its time zone was close to that of Kaptagat, Kenya, where Kipchoge trains. This meant Kipchoge would not be affected by jet lag or have his sleeping and eating patterns disrupted.
 The route was picked to be at low altitude, to increase oxygen in the air and thus help performance.
 Kipchoge wore an improved version of Nike's previously unreleased Vaporfly Next% running shoes, claimed to improve running economy by 4 percent. The shoes were not banned by the IAAF, and the top 10 men in the Chicago Marathon (held the next day) wore Vaporflys. It was reported that Kipchoge and Brigid Kosgei, who broke the women's world record in Chicago, wore bespoke versions of the shoe, with the model called AlphaFLY. The Nike Vaporfly that they wore has a carbon-fibre plate fitted in its chunky foam sole which supposedly helps propel the wearer forward. A group of athletes complained to the IAAF about the shoes, leading the governing body to create a working party to look at the issue. However, Kipchoge had set his world record wearing them a year earlier, as did Abraham Kiptum when he set the half-marathon record. In addition, the five fastest times over the distance were all set by runners wearing these shoes.
 A V-shaped formation of pacemakers shielded the runner from wind resistance. An earlier attempt used a differently shaped diamond formation. Kipchoge was placed at the bottom of the formation with two pacemakers running behind him.
 Hydration was provided by a team coordinator on a bicycle, and not via the usual water station method, in order to save time.

The Breaking2 attempt had been held behind closed doors at Monza with just a few press and Nike employees present. Kipchoge missed the presence of a crowd there and requested that the public be allowed to attend the Ineos 1:59 Challenge.

Pacemakers
A team of forty-one runners served as Kipchoge's pacemakers in the challenge.

References

External links
Official site
Article from BBC Sport: "Eliud Kipchoge: The man, the methods & controversies behind 'moon-landing moment'"  

2019 marathons
2019 in Austrian sport
2010s in Vienna
Marathon world records
October 2019 sports events in Europe 
Marathons in Austria
Sport in Vienna